Sham Binda (14 October 1953 – 16 February 2023) was a Surinamese entrepreneur and politician. A member of the Progressive Reform Party, he served in the National Assembly from 2020 to 2023.

Binda died on 16 February 2023, at the age of 69.

References

1953 births
2023 deaths
Surinamese businesspeople
Progressive Reform Party (Suriname) politicians
Members of the National Assembly (Suriname)